Sirtuin 6 (SIRT6 or Sirt6) is a stress responsive protein deacetylase and mono-ADP ribosyltransferase enzyme encoded by the SIRT6 gene. In laboratory research, SIRT6 appears to function in multiple molecular pathways related to aging, including DNA repair, telomere maintenance, glycolysis and inflammation. SIRT6 is member of the mammalian sirtuin family of proteins, which are homologs to the yeast Sir2 protein.

Research
Sirt6 is mainly known as a deacetylase of histones H3 and H4, an activity by which it changes chromatin density and regulates gene expression. The enzymatic activity of Sirt6, as well as of the other members of the sirtuins family, is dependent upon the binding of the cofactor nicotinamide adenine dinucleotide (NAD+).

Mice which have been genetically engineered to overexpress Sirt6 protein exhibit an extended maximum lifespan. This lifespan extension, of about 15–16 percent, is observed only in male mice.

DNA repair

SIRT6 is a chromatin-associated protein that is required for normal base excision repair and double-strand break repair of DNA damage in mammalian cells.  Deficiency of SIRT6 in mice leads to abnormalities that overlap with aging-associated degenerative processes.  A study of 18 species of rodents showed that the longevity of the species was correlated with the efficiency of the SIRT6 enzyme.

SIRT6 promotes the repair of DNA double-strand breaks by the process of non-homologous end joining and homologous recombination.  SIRT6 stabilizes the repair protein DNA-PKcs (DNA-dependent protein kinase catalytic subunit) at chromatin sites of damage.

As normal human fibroblasts replicate and progress towards replicative senescence the capability to undergo homologous recombinational repair (HRR) declines.  However, over-expression of SIRT6 in “middle-aged” and pre-senescent cells strongly stimulates HRR.  This effect depends on the mono-ADP ribosylation activity of poly(ADP-ribose) polymerase (PARP1).  SIRT6 also rescues the decline in base excision repair of aged human fibroblasts in a PARP1 dependent manner.

Activators 

Sirt6 deacetylation activity can be stimulated by high concentrations (several hundred micromolar) of fatty acids, and more potently by a first series of synthetic activators based on a pyrrolo[1,2-a]quinoxaline scaffold. Crystal structures of Sirt6/activator complexes show that the compounds exploit a SIRT6 specific pocket in the enzyme's substrate acyl binding channel. Among many anthocyanidins studied, cyanidin most potently stimulated activity of the SIRT6.

References

External links 
 
 

Aging-related proteins